Elections were held in the state of Western Australia on 25 March 1950 to elect all 50 members to the Legislative Assembly. The Liberal-Country coalition government, led by Premier Ross McLarty, won a second term in office against the Labor Party, led by Opposition Leader Frank Wise.

The election took place after a major redistribution.

Key dates

Results

|}

 306,099 electors were enrolled to vote at the election, but 12 seats (24% of the total) were uncontested—6 Labor seats (9 less than 1947) representing 26,694 enrolled voters, 2 Liberal seats (the same as 1947) representing 13,278 enrolled voters, and 4 Country seats (two more than 1947) representing 18,538 enrolled voters. This change in distribution means that comparisons in vote percentages between 1947 and 1950 are largely meaningless; they have hence been omitted from the table.

See also
 Members of the Western Australian Legislative Assembly, 1947–1950
 Members of the Western Australian Legislative Assembly, 1950–1953

References

Elections in Western Australia
1950 elections in Australia
1950s in Western Australia
March 1950 events in Australia